Jardega Jarte is one of the woredas in the Oromia Region of Ethiopia. It was part of former Amuru Jarte woreda. Part of the Horo Gudru Welega Zone it is bordered on the east by Abay Chomen, on the south by Horo, on the southwest by Abe Dongoro, on the west by East Welega Zone, on the northwest by Amuru on the north by the Abay River which separates it from the Amhara Region, and on the east by Abay Chomen. The administrative center is Alibo.

Demographics 
The 2007 national census reported a total population for this woreda of 48,943, of whom 24,475 were men and 24,468 were women; 4,757 or 9.72% of its population were urban dwellers. The majority of the inhabitants observed Ethiopian Orthodox Christianity, with 40.47% reporting that as their religion, while 32.19% were Protestants, 14.42% were Moslem, and 11.45% observed traditional beliefs.

Notes 

Districts of Oromia Region